William E. Wilson (1906–1988) was an American writer. He wrote eleven books, including The Wabash, and was a professor of fiction writing and literature at Indiana University from 1950 to 1972.

Biography
William E. Wilson was born in 1906, the son of William E. Wilson, who served as a member of Congress.  The younger Wilson spent much of his childhood in or around Evansville, Indiana. He graduated from Harvard University, served as a lieutenant commander in the U.S. Navy, and spent two years as a Fulbright Scholar at Aix-Marseille University, Grenoble and Nice, France before landing at Baltimore, Maryland where he became Assistant Editor of the Baltimore Sun.

In 1950, he left the Baltimore Sun, joining the faculty of Indiana University where he became a professor of fiction writing and literature until his retirement in 1972.  Indiana University has a William E. Wilson Fellowship in Fiction named in his honor.

Recognition 
He was a Fulbright Lecturer in France from 1956 to 1957 and, in 1964, received an Award of Merit from the American Association of State and Local History. He was honored a number of times with the Indiana Author's Day Award. He was recognized in 1962 by the Southeastern Theatre Association for his plays.

Family 
His first wife, Ellen Janet Cameron, died in 1976. He had three sons with her. He married Hana Benes in 1977.

Death 
Wilson died in 1988 at the age of 82 in Bloomington Hospital in Indiana from cancer.

Bibliography

Non-fiction
The Wabash, Rivers of America Series; Farrar & Rinehart, New York; 1940
Big Knife: The Life of John Rogers Clark, Farrar & Rinehart, New York; 1941
On the Sunny Side of a One Way Street: Humorous Impressions of a Hoosier Boyhood W.W. Norton, New York, 1958
The Angel and the Serpent: The Story of New Harmony, Indiana University Press, Bloomington, Indiana, 1964
Indiana: A History, Indiana University Press, Bloomington, Indiana, 1966

Fiction
Crescent City Simon & Schuster, New York, 1947
The Strangers, McGraw-Hill, New York, 1952
The Raiders, Rinehart & Company, New York; 1955
Everyman Is My Father, Saturday Review Press, New York, 1973

Children’s
Shooting Star: The Story of Tecumseh, Farrar & Rinehart, New York; 1942
Abe Lincoln of Pigeon Creek, McGraw-Hill, New York, 1949

References

Sources
 American Book Exchange
 University of Indiana
  Indiana Authors

1906 births
1988 deaths
Indiana University faculty
Harvard University alumni
20th-century American writers
20th-century American male writers